Zoosystematics and Evolution is a peer-reviewed open access scientific journal covering zoological systematics and evolution. The journal was established in 1898 and is published by Pensoft Publishers on behalf of the Museum für Naturkunde. The editor-in-chief is Matthias Glaubrecht (Museum für Naturkunde).

Abstracting and indexing
The journal is abstracted and indexed in

References

External links

 

Systematics journals
Publications established in 1898
Creative Commons Attribution-licensed journals
English-language journals
Zoology journals
Pensoft Publishers academic journals